= Lajau =

Malaysian village

Coordinates: 5°21′N 115°13′E

Lajau is a village in the Federal Territory of Labuan, Malaysia.
